Arthroleptis xenodactylus (common names: Amani screeching frog, eastern squeaker) is a species of frog in the family Arthroleptidae. It is endemic to eastern Tanzania.
Its natural habitats are lowland and montane forests where it occurs in leaf-litter, under logs, and in the axils of banana leaves. It is a locally common species that is threatened by habitat loss.

References

xenodactylus
Amphibians of Tanzania
Endemic fauna of Tanzania
Taxonomy articles created by Polbot
Amphibians described in 1909